Delvene Delaney (born 26 August 1951) is an Australian actress of soap opera and film, television presenter and singer.

Career 
Delaney was born in Mackay, Queensland, Australia, on 26 August 1951, the beauty pageant winner found fame on Australian television in the 1970s, initially as a weather presenter on Brisbane television. She followed this with stints in soap operas The Box as Penny O'Brien in 1974, and The Young Doctors as nurse Jojo Adams from 1976 to 1977.

Delaney became better known as a recurring cast member of The Paul Hogan Show in the late 1970s. She also made regular appearances as a panel member on the game show Blankety Blanks from 1977 to 1979. She was co-presenter on the quiz show Sale of the Century from 1982 to 1986. She now works for the Byron Bay Animal Hospital.

Personal life 
Delaney was married to The Paul Hogan Show co-star John Cornell for 44 years until his death in July 2021. They have two children, Allira and Liana Cornell. Liana is a model and actress, and Allira is a photographer.

Filmography

FILM

TELEVISION

References

1951 births
Living people
Australian women singers
Australian film actresses
Australian soap opera actresses
Australian television personalities
Women television personalities
Australian game show hosts
People from Mackay, Queensland
People from New South Wales
Weather presenters